The Dominican School of Philosophy and Theology (DSPT) is a Catholic graduate school in Berkeley, California.  It is a member of the interfaith Graduate Theological Union (GTU) and an affiliate of the University of California Berkeley. DSPT is sponsored by the Dominican Order.

DSPT offers certificate and degree programs to women and men of all religions as well as training for the Dominicans of the Western Province.  DSPT is the only graduate level theological institution in the United States to offer a concurrent degree, two master degrees with one thesis in philosophy and theology.

History
In 1851, Dominican missionary Francis Sadoc Vilarrasa and six Dominican novices established a seminary to prepare young men for the priesthood in Monterey, California. In 1854, the seminary moved to Benicia, California. In 1932, seeking to be closer to the University of California, Berkeley, the Dominicans moved the seminary to Oakland, California, renaming it the College of St. Albert the Great.

In 1964, St. Albert received accreditation from the Western Association of Schools and Colleges (WASC) and in the fall of 1964 the college joined the nascent GTU, becoming the first Catholic school to participate in that consortium. In 1978, St. Albert became the Dominican School of Philosophy and Theology.

From the time of its association with the GTU, DSPT had leased space for classes and faculty offices. In 2004, the school purchased a permanent campus site in Berkeley near other GTU member schools and began offering classes at the new site in September 2006.

Academics
DSPT offers the following degree and certificate programs:
 Master of Philosophy
 Master of Theology
 Master of Divinity
 Concurrent Master of Theology / Master of Philosophy
 Concurrent Master of Divinity / Master of Theology
 Master of Theological Studies
 Certificate of Theological Studies
DSPT also accepts non-degree students in its Special Student program. DSPT offers a variety of academic concentrations, including Thomistic studies and religion and the arts.

Accreditation
DSPT is chartered by the State of California as a degree-granting institution of higher education. The school's programs are accredited by WASC and by the Association of Theological Schools (ATS). DSPT is established by the Master of the Order of Preachers (Dominican Order) as a Center of Studies for the Order.

College of Fellows
Members of the DSPT College of Fellows are lay Catholics who gather every year on campus to discuss politics, government, law, economics, business, the sciences, bio-medical research, technology, media, and the arts. Members also participate in student events on campus throughout the academic year. The College of Fellows was formed in 2006 under the leadership of the President, Michael Sweeney, OP.

References
 Official website

Roman Catholic Diocese of Oakland
Catholic seminaries in the United States
Seminaries and theological colleges in California
Dominican universities and colleges in the United States
Schools accredited by the Western Association of Schools and Colleges
Educational institutions established in 1851
Catholic universities and colleges in California
Universities and colleges in Alameda County, California
Education in Berkeley, California
1851 establishments in California
Graduate Theological Union